Crossen an der Elster is a village and municipality in the district Saale-Holzland, in Thuringia, Germany. The White_Elster is the name of the small river which flows through the municipality, so 'Crossen on the Elster' would be the English equivalent.

It is home to the Crossen Palace, a Baroque building with an Italian-style decorated ballroom.

History

The first documented mention of Crossen was 31st March 995.

In 1937 the name of the town was changed to Krossen/Elster. From 1st January 1991 it was officially renamed to Crossen an der Elster.

Culture and Sights 
The main attraction is the  baroque castle; however it is not open to the public.

In addition, there is the revamped church Michaelis's Church, which was first documented in 1320.

Monuments 
There is a monument in the graveyard by an old linden tree in memory of the revolutionaries of 1848. It was erected in the year 1948.

Beside the school there is a memorial for the victims of fascism. It commemorates the resistance fighters of the area, including Communist Party member Willy Graumüller, who was murdered in Bergen-Belsen concentration camp. The Teisker-Siedlung street name is also named for him. 

In November 2016 a 'stumbling block' memorial was laid for Willy Graumüller.

Historical Population 

 Source: Central Statistics Office of Thuringia

Mayor

The honorary mayor Uwe Berndt (The Left) was elected in June 2014.

References 

Municipalities in Thuringia
Saale-Holzland-Kreis